Chamaepetes is a genus of bird in the family Cracidae. It contains the following species:

References

 
Bird genera
Taxonomy articles created by Polbot